Cerro Bravo is a stratovolcano located in Tolima, Colombia, north of the Nevado del Ruiz volcano. The rock type of the volcano is andesite.

Eruptive history 
As with many volcanoes in the region, Bravo's eruptions are often characterized by a central vent (caldera) eruption, followed by an explosive eruption and pyroclastic flows. However, it is unique in the fact that its eruption have also produced lava domes in its caldera. Such eruptions occurred in 1720 ± 150 years, 1050 ± 75 years, and 750 AD ± 150 years (through radiocarbon dating). Eruptions consisting of just a central vent eruption and subsequent explosive eruption took place in 1330 ± 75 years, 1310 BC ± 150 years, 1050 BC ± 200 years and 4280 BC ± 150 years.

Gallery

See also 
 List of volcanoes in Colombia
 List of volcanoes by elevation

References

Bibliography 
 
 

Andean Volcanic Belt
Bravo
Bravo
Quaternary South America
Quaternary volcanoes
Geography of Tolima Department
Four-thousanders of the Andes
VEI-4 volcanoes